Messier 108 (also known as NGC 3556, nicknamed the Surfboard Galaxy) is a barred spiral galaxy about 28 million light-years away from Earth in the northern constellation Ursa Major. It was discovered by Pierre Méchain in 1781 or 1782. From the Earth, this galaxy is seen almost edge-on.

This galaxy is an isolated member of the Ursa Major Cluster of galaxies in the local supercluster. It has a morphological classification of type SBbc in the de Vaucouleurs system, which means it is a barred spiral galaxy with somewhat loosely wound arms. The maximum angular size of the galaxy in the optical band is 11′.1 × 4′.6, and it is inclined 75° to the line of sight.

This galaxy has an estimated mass of 125 billion solar masses and bears about 290 ± 80 globular clusters. Examination of the distribution of neutral hydrogen in this galaxy shows discrete shells of expanding gas extending for several kiloparsecs, known as H1 supershells. These may be driven by currents of dark matter, dust and gas contributing to large star formation, having caused supernovae explosions. Alternatively they may result from an infall from the intergalactic medium or arise from radio jets.

Observations with the Chandra X-ray Observatory have identified 83 X-ray sources, including a source at the nucleus. The brightest of these is consistent with an intermediate-mass black hole accreting matter. The galaxy is also emitting a diffuse soft X-ray radiation within 2.6 arcminutes of the optical galaxy. The spectrum of the source at the core is consistent with an active galactic nucleus, but an examination with the Spitzer Space Telescope showed no indication of activity. The supermassive black hole at the core has an estimated mass of 24 million solar masses.

In January 1969, a type II supernova designated as SN 1969B was discovered in Messier 108. It reached a brightness of 13.9 mag.

SPIRITS 16tn, another supernova in Messier 108, was discovered by the Spitzer Space Telescope in August 2016. The supernova was only visible in infrared light, because it was heavily obscured by dust. Its extinction was estimated to be 8–9 mag, making it one of the most heavily obscured supernovae ever observed.

On 13 March 2023, a third supernova appeared in this galaxy: SN 2023dbc (Type II, mag. 17).

See also
 List of Messier objects
 NGC 2403 - a similar spiral galaxy
 NGC 4631 - a similar spiral galaxy
 NGC 7793 - a similar spiral galaxy

Notes

References

External links

 SEDS: Spiral Galaxy M108
 

Barred spiral galaxies
Ursa Major (constellation)
108
Messier 108
06225
34030
Astronomical objects discovered in 1781
Discoveries by Pierre Méchain
Ursa Major Cluster